Paul Michael Weyrich (October 7, 1942 – December 18, 2008) was an American religious conservative political activist and commentator associated with the New Right. He co-founded the conservative think tanks The Heritage Foundation, the Free Congress Foundation, and the American Legislative Exchange Council (ALEC). He coined the term "moral majority," the name of the political action group Moral Majority that he co-founded in 1979 with Jerry Falwell.

Early life and conservative activism
Weyrich was born in Racine, Wisconsin, to Virginia M. (née Wickstrom) and Ignatius A. Weyrich. His father was a German immigrant. Weyrich graduated from St. Catherine's High School in 1960 and attended the University of Wisconsin–Racine for two years.

He was active in the Racine County Young Republicans from 1961 to 1963 and in Barry Goldwater's 1964 presidential campaign. He spent his early career in journalism as a political reporter for the Milwaukee Sentinel newspaper, as political reporter and weekend anchor for WISN-TV (Milwaukee), and in radio as a reporter for WAXO-FM (Kenosha), WLIP-AM, and as news director of KQXI (Denver).

After Second Vatican Council, Weyrich transferred from the Latin Church of the Roman Catholic Church to the Melkite Greek Catholic Church and was ordained as a deacon.

In 1966, he became press secretary to Republican U.S. Senator Gordon L. Allott of Colorado. While serving in this capacity, he met Jack Wilson, an aide of Joseph Coors, patriarch of the Coors brewing family. Frustrated with the state of public policy research, they founded Analysis and Research Inc. in 1971, but this organization failed to gain traction.

Political activism (1973–2008)

In 1973, persuading Joseph Coors to put the money in, Weyrich and Edwin Feulner founded The Heritage Foundation as a think tank to counter liberal views on taxation and regulation, which they considered to be anti-business. While the organization was at first only minimally influential, it has grown into one of the world's largest public policy research institutes and has been hugely influential in advancing conservative policies. The following year, again with support from Coors, Weyrich founded the Committee for the Survival of a Free Congress (CSFC).

The CSFC, founded by Weyrich, "became active in eastern European politics after the Cold War. Figuring prominently in this effort was Weyrich's right-hand man, Laszlo Pasztor, a former leader of the pro-Nazi Arrow Cross Party in Hungary, which had collaborated with Hitler's Third Reich. After serving two years in prison for his Arrow Cross activities, Pasztor found his way to the United States, where he was instrumental in establishing the ethnic-outreach arm of the Republican national Committee."

Under Weyrich, the CSFC proved highly innovative. It was among the first grassroots organizations to raise funds extensively through direct mail campaigns. It also was one of the first organizations to tap into evangelical Christian churches as places to recruit and cultivate activists and support for social conservative causes. In 1977, Weyrich co-founded Christian Voice with Robert Grant. Two years later, with Jerry Falwell, he founded the Moral Majority (1979–1989).

Over the next two decades, Weyrich founded, co-founded, or held prominent roles in a number of other notable conservative organizations. Among them, he was founder of the American Legislative Exchange Council, an organization of state legislators; a co-founder of the Council for National Policy, a strategy-formulating organization for social conservatives; co-publisher of the magazine Conservative Digest; and national chairman of Coalitions for America, an association of conservative activist organizations. The CSFC, reorganized into the Free Congress Foundation, also remained active.

Under the auspices of the FCF, he founded the Washington, D.C.–based satellite television station National Empowerment Television (NET), later relaunched as the for-profit channel "America's Voice" in 1997. That same year, Weyrich was forced out of the network he had founded when the network's head persuaded its board to force out Weyrich in a hostile takeover. Chip Berlet of Political Research Associates says this was "apparently for his divisive behavior in attacking GOP pragmatists". From 1989 to 1996, he was also president of the Krieble Institute, a unit of the FCF that trained activists to support democracy movements and establish small businesses in Eastern Europe and the former Soviet Union.

By 1997, the Heritage Foundation and the Free Congress Foundation were two of the top five biggest and best funded conservative think tanks.

Before he died, he argued that conservatives "should be fighting to return to family structures of the 1950s, a goal that has been picked up by leaders after him."

Rail transit activism
In contrast with many conservatives, Weyrich had a long history of ardent support for rail mass transit. He opposed "bus rapid transit" (a particular type of bus transit with higher capacity but also higher costs than ordinary bus transit), and instead supported rail transit as a more effective alternative.  In 1988, he co-founded a quarterly magazine on the subject of urban rail transit, called The New Electric Railway Journal, which, until 1996, was published by FCF, and he was its publisher.

He wrote an opinion column for most issues and contributed a few feature articles. FCF discontinued its affiliation with TNERJ in 1996, but the magazine continued being produced, under a different publishing company, until the end of 1998, with Weyrich listed as "Publisher Emeritus". In early 2000, about a year after the last magazine was published, Weyrich and William S. Lind (who had been the magazine's associate publisher until 1996) launched a website where they could continue to post their views and news about rail transit. They called the webpage "The New New Electric Railway Journal", and Weyrich wrote numerous op-ed columns in favor of proposed light rail and metro systems.  He also supported bringing back streetcars to U.S. cities.

Weyrich also served on the national board of Amtrak (1987–1993) and the Amtrak Reform Council, as well as on local and regional rail transit advocacy organizations.

Views

As one of the key figures of the New Right—Harper's Magazine wrote that he was "often described by his admirers as 'the Lenin of social conservatism'"—Weyrich positioned himself as a defender of traditionalist sociopolitical values of states' rights, marriage, anti-communism, and a staunch opponent of the New Left.

In Thy Kingdom Come, Randall Balmer recounts comments that Weyrich, whom he describes as "one of the architects of the Religious Right in the late 1970s", made at a conference sponsored by a religious right organization that they both attended in Washington in 1990:

Bob Jones University had policies that refused black students enrollment until 1971, admitted only married blacks from 1971 to 1975, and prohibited interracial dating and marriage between 1975 and 2000.

In its October 27, 1997 issue, The New Republic published an article "Robespierre of the Right—What I Ate at the Revolution" by David Grann, which portrayed Weyrich as highly effective at creating a conservative establishment but also a volatile and tempestuous figure. Weyrich, supported by Larry Klayman of Judicial Watch, sued the magazine and others for libel; the case was dismissed, then remanded in January 2001, then dropped by Weyrich.

Weyrich abhorred Political Correctness which he called Cultural Marxism, seeing it as a deliberate effort to undermine what he believed was "our traditional, Western, Judeo-Christian culture" and the conservative agenda in American society. In 1999, writing that he believed "we have lost the culture war",  he suggested "a legitimate strategy for us to follow is to look at ways to separate ourselves from the institutions that have been captured by the ideology of Political Correctness, or by other enemies of our traditional culture.... we need to drop out of this [alien and hostile] culture, and find places, even if it is where we physically are right now, where we can live godly, righteous and sober lives."

In response to a 1999 controversy covered by the press concerning a group of Wiccans in the United States military who were holding religious rituals and services on the grounds of the bases they were assigned to, Weyrich sought to exempt Wiccans from the Free Exercise Clause of the First Amendment and bar them from serving in the military altogether. Weyrich, as president of the Free Congress Foundation, led a coalition of ten religious right organizations that attempted a Christian boycott on joining the military until all Wiccans were removed from the services, saying:

Dominionism
According to TheocracyWatch and the Anti-Defamation League, both Weyrich and his Free Congress Foundation were closely associated with dominionism. TheocracyWatch listed both as leading examples of "dominionism in action," citing "a manifesto from Paul Weyrich's Free Congress Foundation," The Integration of Theory and Practice: A Program for the New Traditionalist Movement which "illuminates the tactics of the dominionist movement". TheocracyWatch which calls it "Paul Weyrich's Training Manual", and others, consider this manifesto a virtual playbook for how the "theocratic right" in American politics can get and keep power. The Anti-Defamation League identified Weyrich and the Free Congress Foundation as part of an alliance of more than 50 of the most prominent conservative Christian leaders and organizations that threaten the separation of church and state.

Weyrich continued to reject allegations that he advocated theocracy, saying, "[T]his statement is breathtaking in its bigotry", and dismissed the claim that the Christian right wished to transform America into a theocracy. Katherine Yurica wrote that Weyrich guided Eric Heubeck in writing The Integration of Theory and Practice, the Free Congress Foundation's strategic plan published in 2001 by the FCF, which she says calls for the use of deception, misinformation, and divisiveness to allow conservative evangelical Christian Republicans to gain and keep control of seats of power in the government of the United States.

Dominionism is a controversial term, with many conservatives and religious writers dismissing it as a left-wing term to tar people they disagree with.

Weyrich publicly rejected accusations that he wanted America to become a theocracy:

Criticism of conservatives and homosexuals
Weyrich also often made an issue out of what he claimed were his fellow conservatives' behavior and abuse of power, and he encouraged a grassroots movement in conservatism he called "the next conservatism", which he said should work to "restore America" from the bottom up. Illustrating his point, Weyrich drew a comparison between "how the Christian church grew amidst a decaying Roman Empire" and "how the next conservatism can restore an American republic as a falling America Empire collapses around us."

He advocated a revival of the House Un-American Activities Committee and the Senate Internal Security Subcommittee of the U.S. Senate Committee on the Judiciary, with the aim of identifying and removing communists from the media, which he contended still harbors infiltrators from the former Soviet Union:

In a 2006 interview with Michele Norris of National Public Radio about the 2006 Mark Foley scandal, Weyrich expressed his views regarding homosexuality:

Culture war letter
Frustrated with public indifference to the Lewinsky scandal, Weyrich wrote a letter in February 1999 stating that he believed conservatives had lost the culture war, urging  a separatist strategy where conservatives ought to live apart from corrupted mainstream society and form their own parallel institutions:

This was widely interpreted as Weyrich calling for a retreat from politics, but he almost immediately issued a clarification stating this was not his intent. In the evangelical magazine World he wrote:

By 2004, Weyrich was reportedly more hopeful, given trends in public opinion and the reelection of President George W. Bush. In spite of his initial support for Bush, he often disagreed with Bush administration policies. Examples of their disagreement included the Iraq War, immigration, Harriet Miers, and fiscal policy.

After the fall of the Soviet Union, Weyrich made many trips to Russia and was a supporter of a close Russia-United States relationship.

Spinal injury, disability, and death
Weyrich was diagnosed with a spinal injury known as arachnoiditis, resulting from a 1996 fall on black ice. From 2001 until his death in 2008, his injury left him in a wheelchair and in chronic pain. Complications from that fall required a bilateral, below-the-knee amputation of his legs in July 2005.

Weyrich died on December 18, 2008, aged 66, at Inova Fair Oaks Hospital in Fairfax, Virginia. He was at the hospital for routine tests, and the cause of death was not released. In addition to his spinal injury and amputations, Weyrich suffered from type 2 diabetes. He was interred in Fairfax Memorial Park, Fairfax, Virginia, on December 22, 2008.

Personal
Weyrich and his wife, Joyce Anne (née Smigun), who resided with him in Annandale, Virginia, had five children as well as thirteen grandchildren.

Quotes

 "How many of our Christians have what I call the goo-goo syndrome: good government? They want everybody to vote. I don't want everybody to vote. Elections are not won by a majority of people. They never have been from the beginning of our country, and they are not now. As a matter of fact, our leverage in the elections quite candidly goes up as the voting populace goes down."
 "We are different from previous generations of conservatives... We are no longer working to preserve the status quo. We are radicals, working to overturn the present power structure of this country." – Soloma, John. Ominous Politics: The New Conservative Labyrinth (1984), Hill and Wang Publ., New York
 "The real enemy is the secular humanist mindset which seeks to destroy everything that is good in this society." – "The Rights and Wrongs of the Religious Right", Freedom Writer, Institute for First Amendment Studies, October 1995.
 "Christ was crucified by the Jews... He was not what the Jews had expected so they considered Him a threat. Thus He was put to death." – Indeed, He is Risen!, April 13, 2001
 "We have to stop the movement of all our manufacturing to China and other foreign countries. If that requires tariffs, starting with tariffs to protect industries of strategic importance, so be it."
 "If we want to stop or at least reduce outsourcing of jobs to foreign countries, we should tax outsourcing. In my view, that would be a good new tax."
 "I asked [Yegor] Gaidar why it was that he thought free-market efforts in the Soviet Union were being trashed by American media when the reality was far different from what I was seeing. He replied with a stinging answer, one I never will forget. He said, 'Well, the Soviets spent millions of dollars infiltrating your media. Just because the Soviet Union went away doesn't mean these people have gone away. They are still there.' Of course, I knew this."

References

External links

 Paul Weyrich biography at Free Congress Foundation.
  (2000–2009)
 "Weyrich fears cordial ties between GOP and the Right, The Washington Times, June 17, 2005.
 Evangelical: Religious Right Has Distorted the Faith, Linda Wertheimer. Morning Edition, National Public Radio, June 23, 2006.
 
C-SPAN Q&A interview with Weyrich, March 27, 2005

1942 births
2008 deaths
People from Racine, Wisconsin
American amputees
American Melkite Greek Catholics
Deaths from diabetes
Dominion theology
The Heritage Foundation
New Right (United States)
People from Virginia
University of Wisconsin–Madison alumni
Virginia Republicans
Wisconsin Republicans
Converts to Eastern Catholicism from Roman Catholicism